The 1996–97 Scottish Second Division was won by Ayr United who, along with second placed Hamilton Academical, were promoted to the First Division. Stenhousemuir and Berwick Rangers were relegated to the Third Division.

Table

Top scorers

References 

Scottish Second Division seasons
Scot
3